Tootie's Tempo is an album by pianist Tete Montoliu's Trio recorded in 1976 and released on the Danish label, SteepleChase.

Reception

Ken Dryden of AllMusic said, "This CD is highly recommended, as are all of Tete Montoliu's recordings for Steeplechase."

Track listing
 "Invitation" (Bronisław Kaper)9:49
 "Lover Man" (Jimmy Davis, Ram Ramirez, Jimmy Sherman)5:42
 "Some Other Blues" (John Coltrane)5:45
 "Time for Love" (Slide Hampton)9:31
 "Lament" (J. J. Johnson)8:00
 "Tootie's Tempo" (Tete Montoliu)5:30
 "Darn That Dream" (Eddie DeLange, Jimmy Van Heusen)7:11

Personnel
Tete Montoliupiano
Niels-Henning Ørsted Pedersenbass
Albert Heathdrums

References

Tete Montoliu albums
1979 albums
SteepleChase Records albums